Derek Nippard (1931 – 28 July 2017) was an English football referee. He was the referee at the 1978 FA Cup Final.

References

1931 births
2017 deaths
English football referees
People from Christchurch, Dorset
Sportspeople from Dorset
FA Cup Final referees

20th-century English people